Master Joe (Joel Hernández Rodríguez) and O.G. Black (Adolfo Ramírez Bruno) were a Puerto Rican reggaeton duo. They have released various albums and spawned moderate hits in Puerto Rico. They were part of DJ Joe's Escuadron Del Panico along with Hakeem & Jenay, Ranking Stone, Genio, Guayo Man, Doble Impact, Trebol Clan, and DJ Joe. Their hits include "Bailen Yackien", "Mi Locura (featuring Noriega)", "Mil Amores" and "Matadora". As of 2007, they are no longer a duo.

Discography

Studio álbums 
 Francotiradores (2000)
 Francotiradores 2 (2002)
 Sabotage (2004)
 Los K-Becillas (2005)

Compilation álbums 

 La Coleccion (2003)
 Gold Series Vol.1 (2013)
 Gold Series Vol.2 (2014)

As O.G. Black
 Bajo Tu Observacion (1996) with Q Mac Daddy
 La Hora Cero (March 26, 2009) with Guayo Man "El Bandido"
 Imparable (2013)
 Back To The Underground: El Francotirador Edition (2013)

As Master Joe
 Welcome To My Kingdom (1995)

Singles
 Metimos Las Patas
 Bailen, Yackien
 Bajen Pa' Aca
 Banshee Robao
 Tú Naciste Pa' Mí
 D' Abuso
 Mil Amores
 Matadora

References

Puerto Rican musical duos
Puerto Rican reggaeton musicians
Reggaeton duos